The Dominican Republic competed at the 2012 Summer Olympics in London, United Kingdom, from 27 July to 12 August 2012. This was the nation's thirteenth consecutive appearance at the Olympics.

The Dominican Republic Olympic Committee (COD) sent the nation's largest delegation to the Games. A total of 35 athletes, 15 men and 20 women, competed in 10 sports. For the first time in Olympic history, Dominican Republic was represented by more female than male athletes. Women's volleyball was the only team-based sport in which Dominican Republic was represented at these Olympic games. Among the sports played by the athletes, Dominican Republic marked its Olympic debut in artistic gymnastics.

The Dominican Republic team featured promising athletes: Felix Sánchez, track star in the hurdles and former Olympic gold medalist, Luguelín Santos, world junior champion, and gold medalist at the first Youth Olympic Games, and Gabriel Mercedes, Olympic silver medalist in the men's taekwondo event at Beijing. Two of these athletes won the nation's only medals in athletics at the London games. Felix Sánchez also managed to repeat his gold medal streak from Athens in the men's 400 m hurdles event. Luguelín Santos, on the other hand, settled for the silver instead in the men's 400 metres, behind Grenada's Kirani James. Gabriel Mercedes, being the only medalist to return for his second Olympic appearance, was the nation's flag bearer at the opening ceremony.

Medalists

Competitors
The following is the list of number of competitors participating in the Games:

Athletics

The Dominican Republic had qualifying standards in the following athletics events (up to a maximum of 3 athletes in each event at the 'A' Standard, and 1 at the 'B' Standard):

Key
 Note – Ranks given for track events are within the athlete's heat only
 Q = Qualified for the next round
 q = Qualified for the next round as a fastest loser or, in field events, by position without achieving the qualifying target
 NR = National record
 N/A = Round not applicable for the event
 Bye = Athlete not required to compete in round

Men

Women

Boxing

The Dominican Republic has qualified boxers for the following events

Men

Gymnastics

Artistic
Women

Legend: Q = qualified for individual final*

Judo

The Dominican Republic has qualified 1 judoka

Shooting

The Dominican Republic has qualified one quota place in the men's trap event;

Men

Swimming

Men

Women

Table tennis 

The Dominican Republic has qualified 1 athlete.

Taekwondo 

Gabriel Mercedes has ensured a quota place for the Dominican Republic in the men's 58 kg by reaching the top 3 of the 2011 WTF World Qualification Tournament.

Volleyball

The Dominican Republic has qualified one women's team for the indoor tournament.
 Women's team event – 1 team of 12 players

Women's indoor tournament

Team roster

Group play

Quarter-final

Weightlifting

The Dominican Republic has qualified 2 women.

References

Nations at the 2012 Summer Olympics
2012
Summer Olympics